ADROMICFMS 4 (initialism for "All Dis Ratchets on Me, I Can't Feel My Soul"; stylized as Adromicfms 4) is a mixtape by Spanish rapper and singer Yung Beef, and the fourth entry in the ADROMICFMS quartet. It was released on 1 February 2018 by La Vendición Records.

Critical reception

Yeray S. Iborra of Mondo Sonoro noted that "[a]lthough Yung Beef has not incorporated any gender perspective in ADROMICFMS 4, he has delved into personal ties", and "has added it to topics such as the individual fall, a topic that has dragged on for a long time."

Track listing
All tracks are produced by Steve Lean, except where noted.

Sample credits
 "Intro" interpolates the song "SkinnyNigga" by Yung Beef and Javielito
 "Rosalía" interpolates the song "De Plata" by Rosalía
 "Brazy" interpolates the song "CtrlAltDelete" by Bones
 "Lonely" interpolates the song "I Won't Hold You Back" by Toto
 "Rosas azules" interpolates the song "Can't Sleep" by Above & Beyond
 "Effy" interpolates the song "I'm in Here" by Sia

Personnel
Credits adapted from Tidal.

 Yung Beef – primary vocals
 Steve Lean – production (tracks 1–2, 5, 9–10, 12, 14–17)
 Lowlight – production (tracks 3, 6)
 808 Mafia – production (tracks 8, 13)
 DPBEATS – production (track 11)
 Los del Control – production (track 7)
 Kiid Favela – production (track 4)
 Tre Pounds Hussein – production (track 8)
 Yampi – production (track 4)

Charts

Release history

References

2018 mixtape albums
Spanish-language albums